Sanja Dabevska (born 4 March 1996) is a Macedonian female handballer for RK Lokomotiva Zagreb and the North Macedonia national team.

She represented the North Macedonia at the 2022 European Women's Handball Championship.

References

External links

1996 births
Living people
People from Gostivar
Expatriate handball players